Caudospora is a genus of fungi within the Diaporthales order, class Sordariomycetes. It was later placed in the Sydowiellaceae family.

Species
As accepted by Species Fungorum;
Caudospora iranica 
Caudospora taleola

References

Sordariomycetes genera